Walter Schröder (29 December 1932 – November 2022) was a German rower who competed for the United Team of Germany in the 1960 Summer Olympics. In 1960, he was a crew member of the West German boat which won the gold medal in the eights event.
In 1959 they had won already the European Championships.
After his career as rower he finished his physical education studies, researched and published extensively mainly on rowing and motor learning. He was hired by the University of Hamburg, where he moved up from rowing instructor to Associate Professor for movement studies. Into his section of the department he brought other former athletes, e.g. Arnd Krüger.

References

External links
 

1932 births
2022 deaths
Olympic rowers of the United Team of Germany
Rowers at the 1960 Summer Olympics
Olympic gold medalists for the United Team of Germany
Olympic medalists in rowing
West German male rowers
Medalists at the 1960 Summer Olympics
European Rowing Championships medalists
People from Nordwestmecklenburg